Agnes Steineger (21 January 1863 – 16 June 1965) was a Norwegian painter.

Personal life
Steineger was born in Bergen, Norway. Her father was Peter Stamer Steineger, a merchant and auditor; his mother was Ingeborg Catharine (Hess). She was one of  seven children who included her eldest brother Leonhard Stejneger.

Career
Steineger showed early talent for both music and drawing. In Bergen she was a student at the public drawing school and during 1880 painted with Anders Askevold . She traveled in 1881 to Munich where she studied under Marcus Grønvold and with Bertha Wegmann. When Wegmann traveled to Copenhagen in 1883, Steineger followed and that same year she painted her first significant works, Markblomster, which was exhibited at Bergen Art Association. Steineger was Wegmann's student until 1886 when she traveled to Paris. Here she studied under several teachers, among others Gustave Courtois at Académie Colarossi. Steineger exhibited her work at the Palace of Fine Arts at the 1893 World's Columbian Exposition in Chicago, Illinois. Between  1902-1914, Steineger was a resident in Italy, partly in Sicily and partly in Florence.  From 1914 to 1918, she lived at the Goetheanum cultural centre for the arts in Dornach, Switzerland  operated by Rudolf Steiner.

Among her works are Markblomster from 1883 and Pleiebarn from 1890. A self-portrait from 1895 is located at Bergen Kunstmuseum, and the painting Interiør med lampe from 1915 is found at the National Gallery of Norway.

Selected works
 Markblomster, 1883
 Frida Rusti, 1889
 Pleiebarn, 1890
  Cecilie Dahl, 1897
 Interiør med lampe,  1915

References

1863 births
1965 deaths
Artists from Bergen
19th-century Norwegian painters
20th-century Norwegian painters
Norwegian women painters
19th-century Norwegian women artists
20th-century Norwegian women artists
Norwegian centenarians
Women centenarians